Gessate is a comune (municipality) in the Metropolitan City of Milan in the Italian region Lombardy, located about  northeast of Milan.

Gessate borders the following municipalities: Cambiago, Masate, Pessano con Bornago, Inzago, Gorgonzola and  Bellinzago Lombardo.

Gessate hosts the easternmost terminus of Milan Metro (Line 2, Gessate branch).

References

External links
 Official website

Cities and towns in Lombardy